Aloysius Snosie Simujla (born 22 June 1994) is a Liberian footballer who plays for LPRC Oilers, as a left back.

Career
Born in Monrovia, Simujla has played club football for FC Fassell and LPRC Oilers.

He made his international debut for Liberia in 2013.

References

1994 births
Living people
Liberian footballers
Liberia international footballers
FC Fassell players
LPRC Oilers players
Association football fullbacks